Tadamon or with the definite article al-Tadamon is an Arabic word meaning solidarity. It may refer to:

Sports clubs
Tadamon SC, a Syrian football club based in Latakia
Al-Tadamon SC, a Kuwaiti professional football club based in Al Farwaniya
Tadamon Beirut SC, a Lebanese football club based in Beirut
Tadamon Sour SC, a Lebanese football club based in Tyre
Tadamon Zouk, a Lebanese sports club based in Zouk, Keserwan District

Other uses
 Tadamon, Syria, a neighborhood and district of the al-Midan municipality of Damascus, Syria
 Hizb Al-Tadamon Al-Lubnany, the Solidarity Party of Lebanon

See also
 Tadamun, a Somalia-based NGO